Blues Got Soul was the final album for blues and soul singer King Ernest Baker. He never got to see its release as he was killed in an automobile accident 4 days after finishing it. It was released on the Fat Possum label in 2000. It contains the single "I Must Have Lost My Mind".

Background
The material covered include, "House Where Nobody Lives" which was originally by Tom Waits. It also has "I Must Have Lost My Mind" which has a similarity to an Al Green type of feeling. Other songs  on the release include the love song, "Rock Me in Your Arms" and "Blues Conviction". Baker had a hand in composing material for the album. He wrote half of the songs on the album. Bakers vocals were reminiscent of the Memphis soul, Stax sound.

Baker listened to the final mixes for the album on Thursday, March 2, 2000. On Sunday, March 5, while making his way back to Los Angeles, he was killed in a motor vehicle on Highway 101.

Bakers death was reported in the issue of April 3, 2000 CMJ New Music Report, and that according to Fat Possum Records, a release date had not been set.

A single containing two songs from the album was released in 2002 on Grapevine GSX 5004. It was released on 12", 33⅓ RPM format. The songs on the A side were "I Must Have Lost My Mind (Radio Edit)" (3:50)  and "I Must Have Lost My Mind (Extended Version)" (5:32). The B side contained "Rock Me In Your Arms" (3:35). The groove on “Wood Rat” has to be heard to be believed. No click track, no edits, one take. The credited producer on the single was Andy Kaulkin. Doug Messenger was the engineer and the post production and edits were by Paul Mooney.

Track listing
Adapted from Discogs.
 "Suffer And Stay"    
 "Blues Conviction"    
 "Contentment"    
 "Rock Me In Your Arms"    
 "House Where Nobody Lives"    
 "Fallin' Down On My Face With The Blues"    
 "'Till The Day I Die"    
 "Must Have Lost My Mind"    
 "Wood Rat"    
 "Regular Man"

Personnel
Adapted from CD Universe
 Background vocals: Deston Berry, Rick Holmstrom, Kincaid Smith
 Bass: Laurence Baulden
 Drums: Steve Mugalian
 Guitar: Rick Holmstrom
 Keyboards: Andy Kaulkin 
 Saxophone: Michael Benedict, Efren Santana, Jeff Big Dad Turmes
 Trumpet: Kincaid Smith
 Vocals: King Ernest
Production
 Producer - Andy Kaulkin
 Engineer - Doug Messenger
 Photography - Billy Turner

Singles

References

Reviews
 Blues Society: King Ernest - Blues Got Soul Review
 All About Jazz: King Ernest: Blues Got Soul by Ed Kopp
 Pop Matters: King Ernest, Blues Got Soul by Barbara Flaska
 Blues Bytes: November 2000, WHAT's NEW

2000 albums
Albums published posthumously
King Ernest Baker albums
Fat Possum Records albums